The 2005 Algerian Cup Final was the 41st final of the Algerian Cup. The final took place on June 21, 2005, at Stade 5 Juillet 1962 in Algiers with kick-off at 16:00. ASO Chlef beat USM Sétif 1–0 to win their first Algerian Cup. The competition winners are awarded a berth in the 2006 CAF Confederation Cup.

Pre-match

Details

References

Cup
Algeria
Algerian Cup Finals